Citharinus macrolepis is a species of lutefish from tropical Africa. It is very widespread in the Congo River basin and reaches a length of 75 cm.

References

Daget, J., 1984. Citharinidae. p. 212-216. In J. Daget, J.-P. Gosse and D.F.E. Thys van den Audenaerde (eds.) Check-list of the freshwater fishes of Africa (CLOFFA). ORSTOM, Paris and MRAC, Tervuren. Vol. 1.

Characiformes
Fish of Africa
Taxa named by George Albert Boulenger
Fish described in 1899